Driven is Cueshe's third album released in April 2008 by Musiko Records & Sony BMG Music Entertainment (Philippines), Inc..

Track listing

Reference

External links 
www.titikpilipino.com
www.sonymusic.ph
www.cuesheband.com.ph

2008 albums
Cueshé albums